The 2017–18 Denmark Series was the 53rd season of the Denmark Series, the fourth-tier of the Danish football league structure organised by the Danish FA (DBU). The league was divided in four groups of ten teams each, with the group winners reaching promotion to the 2018–19 Danish 2nd Divisions, while the last place teams suffered automatic relegation to the lower divisions. The eight and ninth placed teams of each group risked playing relegation-playoffs, depending on Danish 2nd Division results. The season was launched in on 5 August 2017 and the final rounds of regular league fixtures were held on 16 June 2018 with the play-off relegation matches being held on 20 June 2018.

Competition format
The first places in each group will reach promotion to the 2nd Division.
The bottoms teams in each group will suffer automatic relegation to the regional divisions.
In each group, the eight and ninth place risk relegation, dependent on the final standings of the 2nd Divisions.

Group 1

Teams and locations

League table

Top goalscorers

Group 2

Teams and locations

League table

Relegation play-offs East

Group 3

Teams and locations

League table

Top goalscorers

Group 4

Teams and locations

League table

Top goalscorers

Relegation play-offs West

References

4
Denmark Series
Denmark Series seasons